Qareh Qabaq-e Olya (also Romanized as Qareh Qābāq-e ‘Olyā; also known as Azhdarbeyglū) is a village in Aslan Duz Rural District, Aslan Duz District, Parsabad County, Ardabil Province, Iran. At the 2006 census, its population was 82, in 16 families.

References 

Towns and villages in Parsabad County